Ebba Mærsk is a container ship owned by the Danish shipping company A. P. Moller-Maersk Group. She is the fifth of the Mærsk E-class, and at the time of delivery she and her seven sister ships were among the largest container ships ever built. She has a total TEU capacity of 11,000 TEU 14-ton containers by Mærsk definition; however, with standard ratings she can hold 14,770 containers. This rating goes by physical space rather than weight.

In popular culture
In the Daniel Suarez novel Kill Decision, Ebba Mærsk is taken over by thousands of automated combat drones hidden in shipping containers.

References

Ships of the Maersk Line
Container ships
Ships built in Odense
Merchant ships of Denmark
2007 ships